Luis Tavares  (born 8 September 1991) is a Dutch-Cape Verdean kickboxer. He is the former Enfusion Heavyweight and Super Heavyweight champion.

He is ranked as the second best light heavyweight by Combat Press as of September 2022, and second best by Beyond Kick as of October 2022. He first entered the Combat Press rankings in May 2017.

Early life
Tavares was born in Rotterdam, the Netherlands to Cape Verdean parents. He played youth football for Sparta Rotterdam, where played together with Georgino Wijnaldum, Lerin Duarte and Garry Rodrigues but later switched to kickboxing.

Kickboxing career
In December 2012, Tavares won his first professional title, the IRO 95 kg European title, with a fourth round knockout of Rodney Glunder. In March 2014, Tavares won his first professional world title, the IKA 95 kg title, with a decision win against Hicham Achalhi. In between these title wins, Tavares made his Glory debut, losing by knockout to Artem Vakhitov.

In October 2015, Tavares participated in the WFL "Unfinished Business" Heavyweight tournament. He defeated Fred Sikking by decision in the semifinals, and Lorenzo Javier Jorge by an extra round decision in the finals.

Enfusion
At Enfusion 49, Tavares fought Mohamed Boubkari for the Enfusion Heavyweight title. He defeated Boubkari by a first round knockout. Moving up to Super Heavyweight, Tavares fought the reigning champion Jahfarr Wilnis. He won by unanimous decision. He defended the title twice, knocking out Mrad Akram and Fatih Ulusoy.

In May 2018, he took part in the A1WCC Heavyweight tournament. He lost the quarterfinal bout to Donegi Abena by an extra round decision.

He fought Kamran Aminzadeh at Enfusion 69, in a non-title bout. Tavares won the fight by unanimous decision. He vacated the Enfusion title in September 2018, after signing with Glory.

Glory
His Glory debut came at Glory 62 against Artur Gorlov. He defeated him by split decision. His second fight was against Felipe Micheletti, at Glory 66. Micheletti won the fight by split decision.

Tavares faced Michael Duut at Glory 69. He won the fight by unanimous decision. Tavares was scheduled to fight Stéphane Susperregui at Glory Collision 2. He defeated Susperregui by unanimous decision. For his fifth Glory appearance, Tavares was scheduled to fight Donegi Abena at Glory 77. He won the fight by unanimous decision.

Tavares was scheduled to fight Sergej Maslobojev at Glory 78: Arnhem. A month before the bout, Maslobojev withdrew due to injury and was replaced by Felipe Micheletti. Tavares won the rematch by unanimous decision.

Tavares was scheduled to challenge the reigning Glory Light Heavyweight champion Artem Vakhitov at Glory 80 on March 19, 2022. Tavares later withdrew from the fight,  as he refused to face Vakhitov due to the 2022 Russian invasion of Ukraine.

Tavares was expected to face Horace Martin at Glory Rivals 1 on May 21, 2022. He was initially expected to face Tarik Khbabez at the same event, before Khbabez withdrew from the bout for undisclosed reasons. The event was later postponed, as The Lotto Arena announced that their cooperation with the Antwerp Fight Organisation had been terminated due to various administrative reasons.

Tavares faced Florent Kaouachi at Glory Rivals 1, a Glory and Enfusion cross-promotion event, on June 11, 2022. He won the fight by a third-round knockout. The result was overturned to a no contest on November 24, as Tavares tested positive for a banned substance.

Failed drug test and suspension
Tavares was expected to face the #3 ranked GLORY light heavyweight contender Sergej Maslobojev for the vacant Glory Light Heavyweight Championship at Glory 81: Ben Saddik vs. Adegbuyi 2 on August 20, 2022. The fight was cancelled on August 10, 2022, due to "reasons on the part of Tavares". Later that day, it was revealed that Tavares had tested positive for an unspecified banned substance at Glory Rivals 1. He was suspended indefinitely by Dutch Martial Arts Authority (VA), while Glory handed him a ten month suspension.

Move to heavyweight
Tavares moved up to heavyweight to take part in the four-man Glory heavyweight tournament, held as a title eliminator for the interim Glory Heavyweight Championship. Tavares faced Enver Sljivar, in the semifinals of the one-day tournament, at Glory 85 on April 29, 2023.

Titles
2017 Enfusion Live Heavyweight Champion +95 kg.
2017 Enfusion Live Light Heavyweight Champion -95 kg.
2015 WFL -95 kg World Tournament Champion
2014 IKA -95 kg World Champion
2012 IRO -95 kg European Muay Thai Champion

Kickboxing record

|-
|-  bgcolor="c5d2ea"
| 2022-05-11 || NC ||align=left| Florent Kaouachi || Glory Rivals 1 || Alkmaar, Netherlands || No Contest || 3 ||  0:27
|-
! style=background:white colspan=9 |

|-  bgcolor="#CCFFCC" 
| 2021-09-04 || Win ||align=left| Felipe Micheletti || Glory 78: Rotterdam || Rotterdam, Netherlands || Decision (Unanimous) || 3 || 3:00 
|-
|-
! style=background:white colspan=9 |
|-  bgcolor="#CCFFCC"
| 2021-01-30 || Win||align=left| Donegi Abena || Glory 77: Rotterdam || Rotterdam, Netherlands || Decision (Unanimous) || 3 || 3:00
|-
|-  bgcolor="#CCFFCC"
| 2019-12-21|| Win||align=left| Stéphane Susperregui || Glory Collision 2 || Arnhem, Netherlands || Decision (Unanimous) || 3 || 3:00
|-  bgcolor="#CCFFCC"
| 2019-10-12 || Win||align=left| Michael Duut || Glory 69: Düsseldorf || Germany || Decision (Unanimous) || 3 || 3:00
|-  style="background:#fbb;"
| 2019-06-22 || Loss ||align=left| Felipe Micheletti || Glory 66: Paris || Paris, France || Decision (Split) || 3 || 3:00
|-
|- style="background:#cfc;"
| 2018-12-08 || Win||align=left| Artur Gorlov   || Glory 62: Rotterdam || Rotterdam, Netherlands || Decision (Split) || 3 ||  3:00 
|-
|-  style="background:#cfc;"
| 2018-06-23 || Win ||align=left| Kamran Aminzadeh || Enfusion 69|| Netherlands || Decision (Unanimous) || 3 || 3:00
|-  style="background:#fbb;"
| 2018-05-05 || Loss ||align=left| Donegi Abena || |A1WCC Champions League Heavyweight Tournament - Quarter finals ||  Belgium || Ext. R. Decision (Unanimous) || 4 || 3:00
|-
|-  style="background:#cfc;"
| 2018-03-09 || Win ||align=left| Fatih Ulusoy || Enfusion 63|| Abu Dhabi || TKO (Corner Stoppage) || 3 ||  
|-
! style=background:white colspan=9 |
|-
|-  style="background:#cfc;"
| 2017-12-02 || Win ||align=left| Mrad Akram || Enfusion Live 57 || The Hague, Netherlands || KO (Spinning back kick) || 1 ||  
|-
! style=background:white colspan=9 |
|-
|-  style="background:#cfc;"
| 2017-09-30 || Win ||align=left| Jahfarr Wilnis || Enfusion Live 53 || Antwerp, Belgium || Decision (Unanimous)  || 5 || 3:00  
|-
! style=background:white colspan=9 |
|-
|-  style="background:#cfc;"
| 2017-04-29 || Win ||align=left| Mohamed Boubkari || Enfusion Live 49 || The Hague, Netherlands || KO || 1 ||  
|-
! style=background:white colspan=9 |
|-
|-  style="background:#cfc;"
| 2017-03-18 || Win ||align=left| Jegish Yegoian  || Enfusion Live 47 || Nijmegen, Netherlands|| Decision (Unanimous)  || 3 || 3:00 
|-
|-  style="background:#fbb;"
| 2016-10-16 || Loss ||align=left| Igor Bugaenko || |ACB KB 8: Only The Braves || Hoofddorp, Netherlands || Ext. R. Decision || 4 || 3:00
|-
|-  style="background:#cfc;"
| 2016-05-14 || Win ||align=left| Andress van Engelen  || Enfusion || Nijmegen, Netherlands  || Decision || 3 || 3:00
|- 
|-  style="background:#cfc;"
| 2016-04-03 || Win ||align=left| Redouan Cairo  || WFL - Where Heroes Meet Legends || Hoofddorp, Netherlands || Decision || 3 || 3:00
|- 
|-  style="background:#cfc;"
| 2015-10-18 || Win ||align=left| Lorenzo Javier Jorge || WFL "Unfinished Business", Final || Hoofddorp, Netherlands || Ext. R. Decision || 3 || 3:00
|-
! style="background:white" colspan=9 | 
|-  style="background:#cfc;"
| 2015-10-18 || Win ||align=left| Fred Sikking || WFL "Unfinished Business", Semi Finals || Hoofddorp, Netherlands || Decision || 3 || 3:00
|-
|-  style="background:#cfc;"
| 2015-05-31 || Win ||align=left| Mohammed Boubkari || King of the Ring || Netherlands || TKO ||  || 
|-
|-  style="background:#cfc;"
| 2015-03-28 || Win ||align=left| Andre Langen || Fightersheart III   || Arnhem, Netherlands || Doc. Stop. ||  || 
|-
|-  style="background:#fbb;"
| 2014-06-06 || Loss ||align=left| Igor Jurković || FFC13: Jurković vs. Tavares || Zadar, Croatia || Decision (unanimous) || 3 || 3:00 
|- 
|-  style="background:#cfc;"
| 2014-03-08 || Win ||align=left| Hicham Achalhi || Kickboxing Empire II || Las Vegas, Nevada, USA || Decision || 5 || 3:00
|-
! style=background:white colspan=9 |
|-
|-  style="background:#cfc;"
| 2013-10-20 || Win ||align=left| Antonis Tzoros  || The Battle VII || Greece || Ext. R. TKO || 4 || 
|-
|-  style="background:#fbb;"
| 2013-06-22 || Loss ||align=left| Artem Vakhitov || Glory 9: New York || New York City, New York, USA || KO (left hook to the body) || 1 || 1:06  
|-
|-  style="background:#cfc;"
| 2012-12-08 || Win ||align=left| Rodney Glunder  || Kickboks Gala Margriethal || Schiedam, Netherlands || KO || 4 || 
|-
! style=background:white colspan=9 |
|- 
|-  style="background:#fbb;"
| 2012-09-02 || Loss ||align=left| Jason Wilnis || Muay Thai Mania V || The Hague, Netherlands || Decision|| 3 || 3:00
|- 
|-  style="background:#fbb;"
| 2012-05-26 || Loss ||align=left| Ismael Lazaar || Fight Explosion || Oud-Beijerland, Netherlands || Decision|| 3 || 3:00
|- 
|-
| colspan=9 | Legend:

See also 
List of male kickboxers

References

External links
 Gloryworldseries Profile

1991 births
Living people
Cape Verdean male kickboxers
Dutch male kickboxers
Light heavyweight kickboxers
Heavyweight kickboxers
Cape Verdean Muay Thai practitioners
Dutch Muay Thai practitioners
Dutch people of Cape Verdean descent
Sportspeople from Rotterdam
Doping cases in kickboxing
Dutch sportspeople in doping cases